Souleymane Youla (born 29 November 1981) is a Guinean football player. He has Turkish citizenship with the name Süleyman Yula.

Career

Club
Youla's professional career started in Belgium in 1999, when Lokeren signed him to replace the departed Jan Koller, who had moved to Anderlecht. Scoring 9 goals in 14 matches, Youla played a successful season, before also being signed by Anderlecht. At Anderlecht, he faced fierce competition in the likes of Koller, Tomasz Radzinski, Aruna Dindane and Oleg Iachtchouk. He only remained for one season but is remembered by Anderlecht fans for his injury time winner against PSV Eindhoven in the 2000–01 UEFA Champions League, allowing Anderlecht to qualify for the Round of 16 as group winners. Youla moved to Turkey where he signed for Gençlerbirliği SK and played five seasons as a first team player. He signed for Beşiktaş J.K., got much less playing time and was loaned out for one season to French side FC Metz. At Metz, he was noticed by Lille, who signed him in 2007. After again a season where he did not receive much opportunities, he was loaned out back to Turkish side Eskişehirspor where he partnered up with Ümit Karan. The following season, the transfer was made permanent. Thereafter, Youla enjoyed two more seasons in Turkey, with Denizlispor and Orduspor. Following the 2010–11 season, he stayed unemployed until November 2012, when he was hired by Belgian team Sint-Niklaas to help the team remain in the Belgian Second Division. On 11 June 2016, Youla signed for North American Soccer League side Indy Eleven.

International
He was part of the Guinean 2004 African Nations Cup team who finished second in their group in the first round of competition. The team progressed to the quarter finals, where they lost to Mali.

Career statistics

International

Statistics accurate as of match played 14 November 2009

International goals

References

External links
 
 

1981 births
Living people
Guinean footballers
Guinean expatriate footballers
Guinea international footballers
Sportspeople from Conakry
Association football forwards
Turkish people of Guinean descent
Naturalized citizens of Turkey
Lille OSC players
FC Metz players
K.S.C. Lokeren Oost-Vlaanderen players
R.S.C. Anderlecht players
Beşiktaş J.K. footballers
Gençlerbirliği S.K. footballers
Eskişehirspor footballers
Denizlispor footballers
Orduspor footballers
Amiens SC players
Stade d'Abidjan players
Budapest Honvéd FC players
Indy Eleven players
Sportkring Sint-Niklaas players
K.S.K. Ronse players
2004 African Cup of Nations players
2008 Africa Cup of Nations players
Ligue 1 players
Ligue 2 players
Belgian Pro League players
Challenger Pro League players
Süper Lig players
TFF First League players
Championnat National players
Nemzeti Bajnokság I players
North American Soccer League players
Guinean expatriate sportspeople in Turkey
Guinean expatriate sportspeople in Hungary
Guinean expatriate sportspeople in France
Guinean expatriate sportspeople in Belgium
Guinean expatriate sportspeople in Ivory Coast
Guinean expatriate sportspeople in the United States
Expatriate footballers in Belgium
Expatriate footballers in Turkey
Expatriate footballers in France
Expatriate footballers in Hungary
Expatriate footballers in Ivory Coast
Expatriate soccer players in the United States
Sint-Eloois-Winkel Sport players